The Bergen Woodwind Quintet is a well-known woodwind quintet based in Bergen, Norway.  The ensemble's members are the principal wind musicians of the Bergen Philharmonic Orchestra, also known as Harmonien, which was founded in 1765 and is one of the world's oldest orchestral institutions.  The quintet often conducts worldwide tours, performing for live audiences, conducting radio broadcasts, and holding master classes for music students.

The ensemble's members are flutist Gro Sandvik, oboist Steinar Hannevold, clarinetist Fredrik Fors, American french hornist  Ilene Chanon, and bassoonist Per Hannevold.

References

External links
 http://www.bwq.no/

Music in Bergen
Wind quintets
Norwegian classical music groups